Echt is an Aberdeenshire crossroads village in northeast Scotland with a population of approximately 300 people. Echt has a number of prehistoric remains, including the Barmekin of Echt which is on a hill to the northwest. There is also the Cullerlie stone circle near Sunhoney Farm, which may date from the Bronze Age.

Echt contains a church, village shop/post office, restaurant (Echt Tandoori) and pleasure park with a designated area of children's play equipment and local football matches are held.  The annual Echt Show, a farmers' show, is held on the 2nd Saturday in July.

It is centred on the junction of the B977 Dunecht—Banchory road and the B9119 Kingsford—Ordie road.

References

 AA Touring Guide to Scotland (1978)

External links 

Echt in the Gazetteer for Scotland

 Virtual Eagle Tour of Barmekin Hill

Villages in Aberdeenshire